Mark Cavagnero, FAIA (born July 7, 1957) is an American architect and the founder of Mark Cavagnero Associates established in 1988.

His works include SFJAZZ Center, in San Francisco, California; the "major Expansion" of the Oakland Museum of California, originally designed by the architect, Kevin Roche; Diane B. Wilsey Center for Opera, in San Francisco Opera,  and the 1995 major renovation of the Legion of Honor museum with Edward Larrabee Barnes.

Career 
"Cavagnero’s career began in 1983 in the New York City office of Edward Larrabee Barnes; his mentorship under Barnes profoundly influenced how he would practice. Five years later, Mark moved west and co-founded Barnes(John Barnes, Edward Larrabee Barnes' son) and Cavagnero (later renamed to Mark Cavagnero Associates)."

Current projects 

 San Francisco Conservatory of Music Tower, San Francisco, CA
 UCSF Weill Institute of Neurosciences, San Francisco, CA
 Monterey Bay Aquarium, Ocean Education Center, Monterey, CA
 Salesforce, London, England
 Salesforce, New York, NY
 Salesforce, San Francisco, CA
 555 Howard Hotel and Residences, San Francisco, CA (with Renzo Piano Building Workshop)
 San Francisco Airport, Consolidated Administrative Campus, San Francisco, CA (with Perkins + Will)
 Moscone Center Expansion, San Francisco, CA (with SOM)
 San Francisco State University, BECA Center, San Francisco, CA
 North Bay Land Co. Housing with the Branson School, Mill Valley,  CA 
 Santa Rosa Junior College, Luther Burbank Theater, Santa Rosa, CA
 Ruth Asawa San Francisco School of the Arts, San Francisco, CA
 Community Music Center, San Francisco, CA
 Slide Ranch, Muir Beach, CA
 St. Mary's High School Chapel, Oakland, CA
 Quincy Courthouse, Quincy, CA
 Placer Courthouse, Auburn, CA
 Santa Clara Courthouse Renovation, San Jose, CA
 Clearlake Courthouse, Clearlake, CA
 Youth Guidance Center, San Francisco, CA
 The Hamlin School Master Plan, San Francisco, CA
 Sonoma State University Green Music Center, Joan and Sanford I. Weill Commons, Sonoma, CA
 Lakeport Courthouse, Lakeport, CA
 Museo ItaloAmericano, San Francisco, CA

Completed projects 
LightHouse for the Blind and Visually Impaired, San Francisco, CA
 College of Marin Academic Center, Kentfield, CA (with TLCD Architecture)
 San Francisco Public Safety Campus, San Francisco, CA (with HOK)
 Diane B. Wilsey Center for Opera, San Francisco, CA
 The Terrace, at the California Academy of Sciences, San Francisco, CA
 UC Berkeley Wurster Hall Fabrication Shop Addition, Berkeley, CA
 Palega Recreation Center, San Francisco, CA
 SFJAZZ Center, San Francisco
 Palo Alto Art Center, Palo Alto, CA
 Mammoth Lakes Courthouse, CA
 East Bay Center for the Performing Arts, Richmond, CA
 Whole Foods Market, Oklahoma City, OK
 Oakland Museum of California, Oakland, CA
 Sava Pool, San Francisco, CA
 Park City Museum, Park City, UT
 Headlands Center for the Arts, Marin Headlands, CA
 Community Foundation of Santa Cruz, Santa Cruz, CA
 Durant Hall, University of California, Berkeley, Berkeley, CA
 ODC Theater, San Francisco, CA
 Marin Horizon School, Mill Valley, CA
 Community School of Music and Arts at Finn Center, Mountain View, CA
 Trinity School, Menlo Park, CA
 The Tannery Arts Center, Digital Media and Creative Arts Center, Santa Cruz, CA
 Clovis Memorial District Conference Center, Clovis, CA
 Chronicle Books Headquarters, San Francisco, CA
 Whole Foods Market, Chicago, IL
 California Palace of the Legion of Honor, San Francisco, CA
 Brava Theater Center, San Francisco, CA
 Rafael Film Center, San Rafael, CA
 de Young Museum Exhibition, San Francisco, CA
 Larsen Park

Awards 
Mark Cavagnero's work have garnered more than "100 design awards from regional, national and international organizations", including the 2015 Maybeck Award, the 2011 Distinguished Practice Award and the 2012 American Institute of Architects, Firm Award.

References 

1957 births
Living people
20th-century American architects
21st-century American architects